The Union of Russia and Ukraine Tercentenary or the Reunification of Ukraine with Russia Tercentenary (300-letiye vossoyedineniya Ukrainy s Rossiyei) was a republic-wide celebration within the Russian SFSR and Ukrainian SSR, marked in the Soviet Union from February 1954, in celebration of the union between Russia and Ukraine formed with the 1654 Pereyaslav Agreement.

In preparation to the event there was created a special Republican commission in commemoration of the Union of Russia and Ukraine Tercentenary headed by the First Secretary of the Communist Party of Ukraine Alexei Kirichenko. Also prior to that in 1953 in Moscow was published a three-volume body of documents and materials titled as "Vossoyedinenie Ukrainy s Rossiyei" (Reunification of Ukraine with Russia) prepared jointly by the History Institute of the Academy of Sciences of the Soviet Union, History Institute of the Academy of Sciences of the Ukrainian SSR, and the Ukrainian Directorate of Archives and included 747 documents of the period between 1620 and 1654. The materials were prepared by a group of Muscovite and Ukrainian historians organized in 1952 and approved by the Central Committee of the Communist Party of the Soviet Union.

In 1954, both Dnipropetrovsk State University and Cherkasy Pedagogical Institute were named after the Union of Russia and Ukraine Tercentenary. Also several cities were renamed including Proskuriv as Khmelnytskyi and Pereyaslav as Pereiaslav-Khmelnytskyi. In Moscow and Kyiv (Kiev) were held full-scale parades.

It was a period when television broadcasting in the Soviet Union was just being started, therefore most of the agitation was being broadcast on radio.

The Russian aspirations to reunite with Ukraine is one of the main subjects in the Soviet historiography. According to the Ukrainian Soviet Encyclopedia, in the 18th century there were no partitions of Poland, but rather reunification of Ukrainian lands (Right-bank Ukraine).

Gallery

References

See also
 

Tricentennial anniversaries
Public holidays in the Soviet Union
Russia–Ukraine relations
1954 in the Soviet Union
Nationalism in the Soviet Union